Orci is a surname. Notable people with the surname include:

J. R. Orci (born 1975), Mexican television writer and producer
Lelio Orci (1937–2019), Italian scientist
Roberto Orci (born 1973), Mexican-American film and television screenwriter and producer